Smogorzów may refer to the following places:
Smogorzów, Lublin Voivodeship (east Poland)
Smogorzów, Masovian Voivodeship (east-central Poland)
Smogorzów, Świętokrzyskie Voivodeship (south-central Poland)
Smogorzów, Opole Voivodeship (south-west Poland)